The Macocha Abyss, also known as the Macocha Gorge, is a sinkhole in the Moravian Karst cave system of the Czech Republic. It is a popular tourist attraction for casual visitors to the region, in addition to cavers and advanced technical divers.

Location
It is part of the Punkva Caves and the Punkva River flows through it.

Description

The dimensions of the abyss allow for its overall daylight and therefore it is classified in the "light hole" abyss category.

At the beginning of the Pustý Žleb (Desolate Canyon), below the town of Sloup, the waters of the Sloupský Brook, one of the tributaries of the subterranean river Punkva, helped to form an extensive system of underground passages, domes and abysses, measuring approximately 6,500 meters, known as the Sloupsko-šošůvské jeskyně (Sloup-Šošůvka Caves). At 3,000 meters long the viewing circuit is the longest underground trail open to the public in the Czech Republic.

Etymology
The name Macocha is derived from macecha, i.e. "stepmother". According to a popular folk story, the abyss got its name after an evil stepmother who married a widowed farmer from a nearby village. The farmer had a son whom she accepted until she gave birth to her own son. Knowing her child wouldn't inherit anything, she decided to lure her step-son to the abyss and throw him into it. Once she realized what she's done, she decided to end her own life by jumping into the very same abyss. Surprisingly, her step-son survived and was eventually saved by his father and other villagers. Another version of the story says that the step-mother didn't commit suicide but was in fact thrown into the abyss after the villagers learnt what she's done to her step-son.

See also
Karst

References

External links

Information on ShowCaves.com

Caves of the Czech Republic
Blansko District
Geography of the South Moravian Region
Sinkholes of the Czech Republic